Łazów  is a village in the administrative district of Gmina Sterdyń, within Sokołów County, Masovian Voivodeship, in east-central Poland.

The village has a population of 300.

External links
 Jewish Community in Łazów on Virtual Shtetl

References

Villages in Sokołów County